The 1979 Lorraine Open was a men's tennis tournament played on indoor carpet courts. The event was part of the 1979 Colgate-Palmolive Grand Prix and was played in Nancy in France. It was the inaugural edition of the tournament and was held from 19 March through 25 March 1979. Fourth-seeded Yannick Noah won the singles title.

Finals

Singles
 Yannick Noah defeated  Jean-Louis Haillet 6–2, 5–7, 6–1, 7–5
 It was Noah's 1st singles title of the year and the 3rd of his career.

Doubles
 Klaus Eberhard /  Karl Meiler defeated  Robin Drysdale /  Andrew Jarrett 4–6, 7–6, 6–3

References

External links
 ITF tournament details

Lorraine Open
Lorraine Open
Lorraine Open
Lorraine Open